Douglas Uggah Embas (born 28 July 1956) is a Malaysian politician who has served as Deputy Premier of Sarawak since 2016. He has been Member of the Sarawak State Legislative Assembly (MLA) for Bukit Saban since 2016, having previously been Member of Parliament (MP) for Betong from 1986 to 2018. He currently serves in the state cabinet of Premier Abang Abdul Rahman Johari Abang Openg as Second Minister for Finance and New Economy, as well as Minister for Infrastructure and Port Development. He previously served as Minister of Agriculture Modernisation and Rural Economy under former chief minister, Adenan Satem. Douglas is a member of the Parti Pesaka Bumiputera Bersatu (PBB), a component party of the ruling state Gabungan Parti Sarawak (GPS) coalition.

Douglas was the Member of Parliament (MP) for Betong from October 1986 to May 2018. During his tenure as an MP, he served in the federal cabinet of three prime ministers Mahathir Mohamad, Abdullah Ahmad Badawi, and Najib Razak. Douglas held the offices of Deputy Minister in the Prime Minister's Department, Deputy Minister of Transport, and Minister of Natural Resources and Environment. His last position was as Minister of Plantation Industries and Commodities, which he held until 2016, when he was appointed Deputy Premier.

Election results

Honours
  :
  Member of the Order of the Defender of the Realm (AMN) (1989)
  :
  Member of the Order of the Star of Sarawak (ABS) (1984)
  Officer of the Order of the Star of Sarawak (PBS) (1985)
  Commander of the Order of the Star of Hornbill Sarawak (PGBK) – Datuk (1998)
  Knight Commander of the Order of the Star of Sarawak (PNBS) – Dato' Sri (2009)
  Knight Commander of the Order of the Star of Hornbill Sarawak (DA) – Datuk Amar (2013)

Notes

References

External links 
 Douglas Uggah Embas on Facebook

 
 

Living people
Members of the Sarawak State Legislative Assembly
Malaysian Anglicans
Malaysian Christians
Knights Commander of the Most Exalted Order of the Star of Sarawak
Iban people
1956 births
People from Sarawak
20th-century Malaysian politicians
21st-century Malaysian politicians
Sarawak state ministers
Members of the Dewan Rakyat
Parti Pesaka Bumiputera Bersatu politicians
Commanders of the Order of the Star of Hornbill Sarawak
Knights Commander of the Order of the Star of Hornbill Sarawak
Government ministers of Malaysia
University of Malaya alumni
Deputy Chief Ministers of Sarawak
Members of the Order of the Defender of the Realm